Tat Hims, alternatively spelled Tathumus, is a village in northern Aleppo Governorate, northwestern Syria. Nearby localities include Qantarah  to the south and al-Rai  to the east. In the 2004 census, Tat Hims had a population of 1,722.

References

Villages in Aleppo Governorate